The 1971–72 Scottish Division One was won by Celtic by ten points over nearest rival Aberdeen. Clyde and Dunfermline finished 17th and 18th respectively and were relegated to the 1972–73 Second Division.

League table

Results

See also
Nine in a row

References

League Tables

1971–72 Scottish Football League
Scottish Division One seasons
Scot